What I Like About You may refer to:

 What I Like About You (TV series), an American sitcom
 "What I Like About You" (The Romantics song), 1980
 "What I Like About You" (Jonas Blue song), 2019
 "What I Like About You", a 2004 song by Jon B. featuring Babyface, from the album Stronger Everyday

See also
 That's What I Like About You (disambiguation)